Cliff Branan (born June 23, 1961) is a former Republican member of the Oklahoma State Senate, representing District 40 from 2002 to 2014. He previously served as Assistant Majority Floor Leader and as Majority Whip.
Branan was a Republican candidate for Oklahoma Corporation Commissioner in the 2014 elections.

Biography
Branan earned his B.B.A. in Finance from the University of Oklahoma in 1984. His professional experience includes working in the commercial real estate business and running Branan Property Company since 1995.

References

1961 births
Candidates in the 2014 United States elections
Living people
Republican Party Oklahoma state senators
University of Oklahoma alumni